Treme or Tremé may refer to:

 Tremé, a historic neighborhood of New Orleans, Louisiana, US
 Treme (TV series), an American series set in New Orleans